Alfington is a small village in East Devon, on the River Otter. It is 2 miles (3 km) north-east of Ottery St Mary.

The church of St James (Church of England) was built of brick in the Early English style in 1849–52 to designs by the architect William Butterfield.

References

External links

 Devon Local Studies - Alfington community page

Villages in Devon
Ottery St Mary